Gonbad Kabud Mosque is related to the Seljuq dynasty and is located in Kalat County.

References

Mosques in Iran
Mosque buildings with domes
National works of Iran